= Fran Prichard =

Francis Hesketh Prichard (30 October 1925 – 31 December 2014) was a British World War II arctic convoy Royal Navy officer and schoolteacher.
